Buch is an old, worn crater that is located in the rugged southern highlands of the Moon. It was named after German geologist Leopold von Buch. It lies to the northeast of the large crater Maurolycus, and the comparably sized crater Büsching is attached to the northeast rim.

The crater rim is slightly elongated in the northeastern direction, and forms an egg-shaped depression in the surface. The rim has been eroded by many lesser impacts so that the edge is rounded and worn down, and the crater forms only a low depression in the ground. Within the crater the floor is relatively flat and featureless, with no central peak at the midpoint. There is only a small craterlet near the northwest rim.

It has been noted (by Shoemaker and others) that the satellite crater Buch B is unusual in that it possesses both a dark halo of material around the rim and appears to have formed some dark rays. Early speculation was that this may be volcanic in nature, but it was later demonstrated to be a typical impact crater that was formed over a pocket of darker material.

Satellite craters
By convention these features are identified on lunar maps by placing the letter on the side of the crater midpoint that is closest to Buch.

References

External links

  Chuck Wood's Lunar Picture of the Day for March 12, 2006.

Impact craters on the Moon